Škoda Auto India Pvt Ltd. has been operating in India since November 2001 as a subsidiary of Škoda Auto, one of the fastest growing car manufacturers in Europe. It has set up a modern manufacturing facility in Shendra near Aurangabad, Maharashtra. The facility is spread across 300,000 m2. The company has a network of 200 outlets across the country.

On 7 October 2019, Volkswagen Group India announced the merger of its three Indian subsidiaries including Škoda Auto India Pvt Ltd into a new entity named Škoda Auto Volkswagen India with headquarters at Pune.

History
Introduced to the market early in 2002, the Octavia was the first domestically built Škoda to be launched in India.  Targeted at the Indian premium segment, its handling, fuel efficiency, and low initial price (compared to other products then available in the Indian market) made the Octavia an instant hit with the Indian car user.  Its turbocharged direct injection (TDI) diesel engined version, in particular, delivered a high level of fuel efficiency and (for the Indian market) power and torque, resulting in higher level of driveability when compared to existing available products.

On 7 October 2019, Volkswagen Group India announced the merger of their four Indian subsidiaries – Volkswagen India Pvt Ltd (VWIPL), Volkswagen Group Sales India Pvt Ltd (NSC), Audi India Pvt.Ltd. and Škoda Auto India Pvt Ltd (SAIPL) – into a single entity named Škoda Auto Volkswagen India Pvt Ltd with headquarters at Pune. Gurpratap Boparai was appointed as the first Managing Director of Škoda Auto Volkswagen India.

Manufacturing Facilities

ŠKODA Auto India Private Limited (SAIPL) has its assembly plant located at Shendra on the outskirts west of Aurangabad, which has an annual capacity of 89,000 vehicles. Production of the Škoda Fabia ended in 2013 due to low sales and high assembly cost.

Models
Škoda Auto India currently sells the following fundamental models:

Current models

Discontinued models
 Škoda Octavia  (2002-2023) 
 Škoda Superb  (2004-2023) 
 Škoda Octavia Combi  (2005-2008) 
 Skoda Laura  (2005-2013) 
 Škoda Fabia  (2008-2013) 
 Škoda Yeti (2010-2017)
 Škoda Rapid (2011-2021)
 Škoda Karoq (2020-2021)

Sales and Service Network
Škoda Auto India Private Limited currently has 103 showrooms and 102 service centers across 81 cities.

Sales Performance

In 2014, Škoda Auto India Private Limited sold 15,342 units.
In 2015, Škoda Auto India Private Limited sold 15,457 units.

In 2016, Škoda Auto India Private Limited sold 13,414 units.

In 2017, Škoda Auto India Private Limited sold 17,438 units.

In 2018, Škoda Auto India Private Limited sold 17,244 units.

In 2019, Škoda Auto India Private Limited sold 15,284 units.

In 2022, Skoda Auto India says wholesales rose 10% to 4,222 units in August.

See also
 Make in Maharashtra
 Škoda Auto
 Volkswagen Group
 Volkswagen Group Sales India
 Automotive industry in India

References

External links
 Škoda-Auto.co.in Škoda Auto India official website
 Škoda reviews on Škoda India's Facebook page

India
Car manufacturers of India
Companies based in Maharashtra
Vehicle manufacturing companies established in 2001
Indian subsidiaries of foreign companies
Economy of Aurangabad, Maharashtra
2001 establishments in Maharashtra
Indian companies established in 2001
Aurangabad district, Maharashtra

it:Škoda Auto#Impianti produttivi